Milići is a town and a municipality located in Republika Srpska, an entity of Bosnia and Herzegovina. As of 2013, it has a population of 11,441 inhabitants, while the town of Milići has a population of 2,368 inhabitants.

Settlements

 Bačići
 Bešići
 Bijelo Polje
 Bišina
 Bukovica Donja
 Bukovica Gornja
 Buljevići
 Derventa
 Donje Vrsinje
 Dubačko
 Dubnica
 Dukići
 Đile
 Đurđevići
 Gerovi
 Glušac
 Golići
 Gornje Vrsinje
 Gunjaci
 Jeremići
 Kokanovići
 Koprivno
 Kostrača
 Krajčinovići
 Lukavica
 Lukići
 Maćesi
 Milići
 Mišići
 Nova Kasaba
 Nurići
 Pavkovići
 Podbirač
 Podgora
 Pomol
 Rajići
 Raševo
 Raškovići
 Ristijevići
 Rovaši
 Rupovo Brdo
 Sebiočina
 Skugrići
 Supač
 Štedra
 Toljevići
 Višnjica
 Vitići
 Vrtoče
 Vukovići
 Vukšići
 Zabrđe
 Zagrađe
 Zaklopača

Demographics

Population

Ethnic composition

Economy
The economy of Milići is dominated by bauxite extraction mining company "Boksit", a multi-faceted company originally established in 1959.

The following table gives a preview of total number of registered people employed in legal entities per their core activity (as of 2018):

Sports
The local football team, FK Boksit Milići, were also established by the company in 1972.

In the 1990s, businessman Rajko Dukić invested in sports development in Milići, and local teams became champions of Republika Srpska in football, chess, bowling and women's handball. He also invested in a large cultural complex occupying the centre of the town, including a museum, motel, pool complex and the 65-metre tall 'Rajko's Tower'.

See also
 Municipalities of Republika Srpska

References

 Official results from the book Ethnic composition of Bosnia-Herzegovina population, by municipalities and settlements, 1991. Census, Zavod za statistiku Bosne i Hercegovine - Bilten no.234, Sarajevo 1991.

External links

Populated places in Milići, Republika Srpska
Municipalities of Republika Srpska